Ryan A. Taylor, known professionally as Trinity "The Tuck" Taylor or just Trinity the Tuck (born December 10, 1985), is an American drag queen and recording artist best known for competing on the ninth season of RuPaul's Drag Race and for winning the fourth season of RuPaul's Drag Race All Stars, shared with Monét X Change. She went by Trinity "the Tuck" Taylor on her original season, but on the first episode of All Stars, she indicated that she would henceforth go simply by Trinity the Tuck. 

Trinity recently competed on the seventh season of RuPaul's Drag Race All Stars, the first all winners edition of the franchise.

Early life 
Taylor was born in Birmingham, Alabama, and grew up in Trussville and Springville, Alabama, attending Springville High School. Shortly after her birth, Taylor was raised by her grandparents due to her mother contracting HIV and subsequently dying. Her drag mother is Jordan Kennedy.

Career
Trinity was named Miss Pulse by Pulse nightclub in 2011. She has won several national pageants, including National Entertainer of the year (against Alyssa Edwards) in 2014 and Miss National Renaissance 2016. She has also performed worldwide as a backup dancer for Andy Bell from Erasure.

RuPaul's Drag Race

In February 2017, Trinity was announced being among fourteen contestants for the ninth season of RuPaul's Drag Race. She won three challenges during the course of the competition, in episodes three, seven and ten. Trinity placed in the top four overall, after losing a lip sync to "Stronger" by Britney Spears against Peppermint. She was referenced in a skit on Saturday Night Live in May 2017.

Trinity was announced to compete on the fourth season of RuPaul's Drag Race All Stars on November 9, 2018. She was referred to as Trinity the Tuck instead of Trinity Taylor. Following her appearance on All Stars, Trinity was interviewed by Vogue for paying homage to a famous Prada dress worn by Sarah Paulson. Paulson publicly thanked Trinity for the special honor through several of her social media platforms. Trinity later won the season in a tie with Monét X Change, having placed in the top two four times throughout the competition (in episodes one, three, seven, and nine) as well as winning two lipsyncs which gave her the power to eliminate Jasmine Masters in episode one and Latrice Royale in episode nine.

She was cast to be one of ten Drag Race alumni to be on RuPaul's Celebrity Drag Race, where she served as a mentor for Loni Love.

In April 2022, it was announced that Trinity would be competing on the seventh season of RuPaul's Drag Race All Stars, the first all winners edition of the franchise.

Other ventures
In 2019, Trinity was featured on Botched for lip correction surgery.

On November 3, 2019, Trinity launched her podcast Werk with Trinity the Tuck, which features recurring and special guests. She has also continued to release new episodes of her YouTube series Talking with the Tuck.

Trinity appeared in the music video for the song "You Need to Calm Down" by Taylor Swift as Lady Gaga.

In 2020, Trinity appeared in the Netflix original AJ and the Queen as a well-known pageant drag queen.

Trinity was featured on Out Magazine, Gay Times, PinkNews and various other press publications for her tribute project where she recreated iconic runway looks from previous RuPaul's Drag Race winners. The project, a collaboration with her boyfriend Leo Llanos, has garnered her high praise from fans, Drag Race alumni and press outlets for its captivating imagery and reinvented fashion styles. Trinity, along with her All Stars 4 co-winner Monét X Change, collaborated with Llanos to recreate looks from To Wong Foo to celebrate the end of their reign. In June 2019, a panel of judges from New York magazine placed her 15th on their list of "the most powerful drag queens in America", a ranking of 100 former Drag Race contestants.

In June 2020, Trinity interviewed Cyndi Lauper, as part of the YouTube series We Stan, to talk about the Stonewall Riots and the importance of activism.

In 2020, Trinity launched her all inclusive digital drag competition, Love for the Arts on Twitch, where contestants from all over the world compete to find out which contestant is the best drag artist of them all.

In 2021, Trinity appeared on Celebrity Karaoke Club Drag Edition as a contestant. Trinity ultimately won the competition, beating out fellow Drag Race alumni, Manila Luzon and The Vivienne.

In 2022, Trinity, in partnership with Producer Entertainment Group, launched their own brand of flavored vodka, courtesy of Serv Vodka.

Music 
During the first episode of All Stars 4, she premiered an original comedy song titled "The Perfect Tuck" during the episode's variety show and won the challenge. The song was released for digital download on the same day. Her second solo single, a dance track called "The Face, the Body", was released on January 25, 2019. A music video for her third single, "I Call Shade", was released on February 14, 2019, and features Peppermint. The music video has over a million views. Her debut album Plastic premiered at number 9 on the Billboard Comedy Albums chart.

She appeared in the music videos for Latrice Royale's "Excuse the Beauty" and Aja's "I Don't Wanna Brag". On November 29, 2019, Trinity released a promotional holiday single called Trinity Ruins Christmas.

In 2021, Trinity released Mood Swing, an EP including the singles "Witch" and "Call Me Mommy Daddy" featuring Jozea Flores.

In 2022, Trinity released "Walk. Slay. Serv. Repeat."

Personal life
As of at least mid-2017, Taylor lives in Orlando, Florida. She has had plastic surgery, including having her ears pinned and a rhinoplasty by Dr. Miami Michael Salzhauer. On March 31, 2022, she came out as non-binary and transgender. She uses she/they pronouns.

Filmography

Television

Music videos

Web series

Discography

Studio albums

Extended plays

Singles

As lead artist

As featured artist

Tours 
 Werk the World
 War on the Catwalk
 A Drag Queen Christmas
Haters Roast
 Plastic World Tour

Awards and nominations

References

External links

 

1985 births
Living people
American drag queens
American LGBT singers
American podcasters
LGBT people from Alabama
LGBT people from Florida
Non-binary drag performers
Non-binary musicians
People from Birmingham, Alabama
People from Orlando, Florida
Trinity Taylor
Trinity Taylor
Transgender non-binary people